Carmen High School of Science and Technology is a charter school in the Milwaukee Public Schools district in Wisconsin. It is located at 1712 South 32nd Street in Milwaukee, Wisconsin. It includes a South Campus and a Northwest Campus. It was ranked 7th best school in Wisconsin by U.S. News & World Report.

External links

Public high schools in Wisconsin